Insidia is the tenth studio album by the Italian rock band Litfiba and the second with Gianluigi Cavallo as vocalist.

Track listing
 "Mr. Hyde" – 4:48
 "Insidia" – 3:15
 "La stanza dell'oro" – 3:54
 "Nell'attimo" – 4:07
 "Invisibile" – 4:31
 "Il branco" – 3:39
 "Ruggine" – 3:24
 "Senza rete" – 3:26
 "Luce che trema" – 2:52
 "Oceano" – 6:26

Personnel
Gianluigi Cavallo – vocals
Ghigo Renzulli – guitars
Gianmarco Colzi – drums
Gianluca Venier – bass guitar

References

Litfiba albums
2001 albums
EMI Records albums
Italian-language albums